Auto detailing is an activity that keeps the vehicle in its best possible condition, especially cosmetic, as opposed to mechanical. This is achieved by removing both visible and invisible contaminants from the vehicle's interior, and polishing the exterior to its original blemish-free finish. The most basic detail options include an exterior wash and wax, interior vacuuming, window cleaning and surface polishing.

Background
Professional detailing services and sale of products to both professionals and enthusiasts represent a large commercial presence in places where automobiles are a primary mode of transport. In the United States alone, the professional and home detailing industry was over $9 billion in revenue, as of April 2014.

Components of detailing
Detailing is more than a cleaning process to make a vehicle look good, but a systematic approach to help extending its life with methods and products that reduce damaging environmental elements such as dirt, sun, harsh winters, etc. Appropriate maintenance or restoration of vehicles to keep them looking outside and inside as if they came from an auto dealer's showroom increase their resale value. Auto detailing requires knowledge of proper techniques and use of tools and products.

Detailing is generally broken down into two categories: exterior and interior (or cabin). There are products and services that focus on these two areas specifically.

Exterior detailing involves cleaning, and either restoring or exceeding the original condition of the surface of the car's finish (usually a paint with a glossy finish), chrome trim, windows, wheels, and tires, as well as other visible components on a vehicle's exterior. A wide array of detailing products and techniques are used, based on the vehicle's surface type and condition, or the detailers or customers preference. Products include, but are not limited to: detergents, surfactants, acid free degreasers (to break down dirt and soil), detail clay (to remove invisible microembedded surface contaminates), waxes, and silicone- and non-silicone-based dressings for plastic trim and tires. Buffing compounds and polishes to resurface and improve reflectivity of the paint finish, as well as a variety of applicators, brushes, and drying towels.

Interior detailing involves a deep cleaning of the whole interior cabin. Vehicle interiors of the last 50 years comprise a variety of materials, such as synthetic carpet upholstery, vinyl, leather, various natural fibers, carbon fiber composites, plastics, and others, which necessitates the use of a variety of cleaning techniques and products. Vacuuming is standard, and upholstery stains may be removed using steam cleaning, liquid and foam chemicals, as well as brushes. Additionally, some nonporous surfaces may be polished.

See also 
 Automotive restoration
 Car wash
 Mitter curtain (related to Car wash)

References 

Motor vehicle maintenance